Tugal Caris (active 1630 – 1666), also spelled Carris or Cariste, was a 17th-century French ecclesiastical sculptor and ecclesiastical architect who worked in Nantes and Rennes.

Biography 
Caris was born in the late sixteenth or early seventeenth century, and was from Laval; in 1630 there is a record of him living there. He later moved to Rennes and died in Nantes.

He married Jeanne Barais, probably the sister of Catherine Barais, wife of the architect Michel Bellier. One of their children, Jacques Caris, also became an architect in Nantes.

Altarpieces 
His first known commission for an altar was at Vaiges in 1634; this is no longer extant. The altars in the church of St Denis at Saint-Denis-du-Maine (1632) and in St Peter's at Nuillé-sur-Ouette (1633) can probably also be attributed to him. From 1634 to 1636, he created the altarpiece at Redon Abbey. 

Caris's most important altarpieces were created while he was living in Rennes. In 1642 he is believed to have created the high altar ensemble with side altars in the church at Availles-sur-Seiche, as well as the altarpiece at Rannée. The altarpiece of the high altar of the church at Tinténiac may also be his work. In 1651 he was responsible for the main altarpiece at Gaël.

Architect at Rennes and Nantes 

In 1648 he left Rennes for Nantes, where  in 1656 he was contracted to oversee work on the cathedral.

References

Further reading 
 Roger Blot, "Les retables de Tugal Caris", Vie Diocésaine, Rennes, 20, 10 November 1999, pp. 532–33 
 Jacques Salbert, Les ateliers de retabliers lavallois aux XVIIe et XVIIIe siècles. Étude historique et artistique, Paris: Klincksieck, 1976,  

Renaissance architects
17th-century French sculptors
17th-century French architects
Date of birth unknown
16th-century births

1660s deaths
Place of birth missing